Skubic is a Slovenian surname. Notable people with this surname include:

 Andrej E. Skubic (born 1967), Slovenian writer, playwright and translator
 Michelle C. Skubic (born c. 1966), United States Navy admiral
 Nejc Skubic (born 1989), Slovenian footballer
 Vera Skubic (1921–1998), one of the builders of Hodgkins and Skubic House